Ricuzenius is a genus of sculpins native to the northwestern Pacific Ocean.

Species
There are currently two recognized species in this genus:
 Ricuzenius nudithorax Bolin, 1936
 Ricuzenius pinetorum Jordan & Starks, 1904

References

Cottinae
Marine fish genera
Taxa named by David Starr Jordan
Taxa named by Edwin Chapin Starks